Alka Verma is an Indian actress. She started her acting career in the TV series C.I.D.

Career
She started her career in the famous TV shows C.I.D. In this show she was playing the role Inspector Muskaan Gupta, Her first episode was the Red Rose Killer and last was The case of Inspector Daya's Abduction. In her last episode the reason of her quit was transferring. However, she was never kicked out in reality she left C.I.D. because she has gotten the offer in the movie Unforgettable. Alka and her friends have opened a coffee shop named Coffee Adha.

Filmography

References

External links

Living people
Actresses from Mumbai
1968 births
Indian television actresses
Actresses in Hindi television
21st-century Indian actresses